Francis Ryan Smith,  was an Australian flying ace of the First World War, credited with 16 aerial victories. Following the war, he studied engineering and worked in China, eventually starting his own aviation business. During the Second World War, Smith served in the Royal Australian Air Force, as a squadron leader.

World War I service
Francis Ryan Smith was born 23 July 1896, in Brisbane, Queensland. He worked as a clerk before joining the Australian Imperial Force on 20 July 1915, during the First World War. As an infantry officer, he served with distinction in the 31st Battalion, seeing action on the Western Front at Fromelles and then later around Armentieres in 1916, for which he was awarded the Military Cross, for bravery under fire. He transferred to the Australian Flying Corps for training, then joined No. 2 Squadron AFC as a pilot on 28 February 1918.

Piloting a RAF SE.5a,
he was credited with a total of 16 aerial victories, consisting of nine enemy aircraft sent down out of control, and seven others destroyed including one shared.

Along the way, Smith became a Flight Leader by mid-September 1918; he also became his squadron's leading ace. Additionally, he became the squadron's final casualty, being shot down on 10 November 1918. Although downed behind enemy lines, he evaded capture by donning civilian clothing and covering 40 miles back to his squadron mess. He found his squadron-mates celebrating the Armistice ending the war.

He returned to Australia on 6 May 1919. By 18 June, he had been discharged.

Later life
Post war, Smith studied engineering at St Leo's College, in Brisbane, and in 1920 moved to Amoy, in China to work for a merchant company. He later moved to Shanghai as he progressed in the company and in 1935 started an aviation company in Hong Kong. He married his cousin, Annie (Nancy) Power, while in China and had two children.

He returned to Australia in 1941, and during the Second World War, Smith served in the Royal Australian Air Force, achieving the rank of squadron leader before being discharged in January 1944. His final posting on discharge was No. 3 Wing, Air Training Corps.

In 1951, Smith leased an auto service station in Willandra, Ryde, New South Wales. He died on 24 December 1961 in Balmain, New South Wales.

Honours and awards
Military Cross (MC):

Distinguished Flying Cross (DFC):

Notes

References

1896 births
1961 deaths
Australian Army officers
Australian Flying Corps officers
Australian military personnel of World War I
Royal Australian Air Force personnel of World War II
Australian World War I flying aces
People from Brisbane
Recipients of the Distinguished Flying Cross (United Kingdom)
Recipients of the Military Cross
Royal Australian Air Force officers
Military personnel from Brisbane